The Daumen Group is a mountain range of the Allgäu Alps, named after Großer Daumen, the highest mountain in the range.

Geography
Major peaks include:
 Großer Daumen - 2280 m
 Schneck - 2268 m
 Westlicher Wengenkopf - 2235 m
 Nebelhorn - 2224 m
 Östlicher Wengenkopf - 2206 m
 Rotkopf - 2194 m
 Laufbacher Eck - 2177 m
 Himmelhorn - 2113 m
 Lachenkopf - 2112 m
 Schochen - 2100 m
 Kleiner Seekopf - 2096 m
 Salober - 2088 m
 Großer Seekopf 2085 m
 Gundkopf - 2062 m
 Laufbichlkirche - 2044 m
 Entschenkopf - 2043 m
 Rotspitze - 2033 m

References

External links 

Allgäu Alps
Mountain ranges of the Alps
Mountain ranges of Bavaria